Diane Wilson is an American environmental activist, an anti-war activist, and an author. In 1989, she was a shrimp boat captain in Calhoun County, Texas, and she saw an Associated Press article saying that the county had the most toxic waste disposal of all counties in America. Wilson began a campaign against Formosa Plastics, a Taiwanese chemical company then building a PVC (polyvinyl chloride) facility near her town, with tactics including several hunger strikes and sinking her own boat to draw attention to the matter. In 1994 she won "zero discharge" agreements (meaning no liquid effluent discharge into the environment) from Formosa and Alcoa.

Wilson has also protested at meetings concerning the BP oil spill, as well as protesting in support of victims of the 1984 Bhopal, India, Union Carbide gas leak.

She is a co-founder of the anti-war organization CODEPINK.

In 2005 a documentary was made about her, titled Texas Gold.  It won several awards, including "Best Documentary" at the New York City Short Film Festival.

She has received the "Hellraiser of the Month" award from Mother Jones magazine, and a number of other awards, including National Fisherman Magazine Award, Louis Gibbs' Environmental Lifetime Award, Louisiana Environmental Action (LEAN) Environmental Award, Giraffe Project, Jenifer Altman Award and the Bioneers Award.

In 2006, she was honored with the Blue Planet Award from Ethecon Foundation, one of the comparatively very few 'grass-root' foundations for "more than 20 years of commitment to environmental issues, even putting her life at risk."

In 2013, Wilson participated in the movement to close Guantanamo Bay, calling for Obama to release the prisoners that had been declared for release, give the men a fair trial, and end indefinite detention. Most notably, she stood in solidarity with the hunger strikers by fasting on salt and water for 58 days. Her fast ended on June 26, 2013 on International Day in Support of Victims of Torture after jumping the White House fence at a Close Guantanamo protest (with groups including Amnesty International, CODEPINK, Veterans for Peace, and Witness Against Torture) in an attempt to deliver a letter to President Barack Obama. Wilson was charged with unlawful entry and handed over to local authorities.

In 2019, she was a plaintiff to a suit, Waterkeeper v. Formosa, against Formosa Plastics for violations of the Clean Water Act resulting in discharges of pollution along the Texas coast. Along with other volunteers, she collected millions of nurdles that served as evidence in the case. The suit was settled for $50 million in October 2019.

Books
 An Unreasonable Woman: A True Story of Shrimpers, Politicos, Polluters and the Fight for Seadrift, Texas by Diane Wilson
 Diary of an Eco-Outlaw: An Unreasonable Woman Breaks the Law for Mother Earth by Diane Wilson
 Holy Roller: Growing Up in the Church of Knock Down, Drag Out; or, How I Quit Loving a Blue-Eyed Jesus by Diane Wilson
 Nobody Particular: One Woman's Fight to Save The Bays by Molly Bang

References

External links
Diane Wilson's blog
Portrait of Diane Wilson, "Texas Gold" (2008) at IMDb and on YouTube

Year of birth missing (living people)
Living people
People from Calhoun County, Texas
American environmentalists
American women environmentalists
American anti-war activists
Activists from Texas